The 2016 African Handball Cup Winners' Cup was the 22nd edition, organized by the African Handball Confederation, under the auspices of the International Handball Federation, the handball sport governing body. The tournament was held from May 5–27, 2016 and took place at the Salle Al Jadida, in Laayoune, Morocco, contested by 11 teams and won by Zamalek Sporting Club of Egypt.

Draw

Preliminary rounds

Times given below are in WET UTC+0.

Group A

* Note:  Advance to quarter-finals Relegated to 9-12th classification

Group B

* Note:  Advance to quarter-finals Relegated to 9-12th classification

Knockout stage
Championship bracket

5-8th bracket

9-11th classification

Final standings

Awards

See also 
2016 African Handball Champions League

References

External links 
 CAHB official website

African Handball Cup Winners' Cup
2016 in African handball
2016 in Moroccan sport
Handball in Morocco